It Happened in Athens is a 1962 American-Greek romance comedy-drama film released by 20th Century-Fox. It is directed by Andrew Marton and features Jayne Mansfield, newcomer Trax Colton, Maria Xénia, Nico Minardos, Roger Browne in his debut, and Olympic champion Bob Mathias.

Plot
In 1896 it is announced the Olympic Games will be revived and played in Athens. Young shepherd, Spiridon Loues (Colton, in a fictionalized but sometimes accurate portrayal of water-carrier Spyridon Louis), decides to enter the 26-mile marathon. Once in Athens he meets Christina Gratsos (Kalogeropoulou) a young woman from his hometown who is now the personal maid to Greece's most famous actress, Eleni Costa (Mansfield). Eleni's lover, Lt. Alexi Vinardos (Minardos), is a powerful man in Greece and a respected runner. Though Spiridon arrived after the entry date, his persistence and athletic prowess so impress the Olympic officials and Coach Graham (Mathias), that he is admitted to compete in the race.

To promote herself, Eleni announces she'll marry the winner of the marathon, having faith that it will be her beloved Vinardos. Her proposal is heavily promoted in the press. However upon meeting Spiridon, Eleni pursues him romantically. Spiridon stays true to Christina, and tries to assuage her fear of being deserted for Eleni.

After starting the race in dead last, and accompanied most of the way by his small dog, Spiridon wins the race. Eleni has a change of heart and tells Spiridon to find Christina and marry her, stating "...she's your girl, not me". Spiridon tries to run to find Christina, but faints. He is revived two hours later and initially believes everything has been a dream. Christina finds Spiridon as he returns to the finishing line to remember his glory, and they share a kiss.

Cast
 Trax Colton as Spiridon Loues
 Jayne Mansfield as Eleni Costa
 Xenia Kalogeropoulou  (credited as Maria Xénia) as Christina Gratos
 Nico Minardos as Lt. Alexi Vinardos
 Bob Mathias as Coach Graham
 Ivan Triesault as Grandpa Loues/Mr. Trisapopolis
 Lili Valenty as Mama Loues
 Titos Vandis as Father Loues
 Charles Fawcett as Ambassador Cyrus T. Gaylord
 Jean Murat as Pierre de Coubertin
 Roger Browne (credited as Bill Browne) as Drake
 Marion Siva as Maria Loues
 Paul Müller as Priest
 Gustavo De Nardo as George
 Roger Fradet as Dubois
 Alberto Rabagliati : Greek supporter

Production background

Development
The project was originally announced by MGM in 1951 from a story by Laslo Vadney which had been turned into a script by Everett Freeman. Sidney Sheldon was to produce with Ricardo Montalbán, John Hodiak or Fernando Lamas to star. It was intended to film in Greece. However MGM did not proceed.

In 1960, it was announced 20th Century-Fox had purchased the script from MGM and were going to make it, with Robert Wagner mentioned as a possible star. The title was now And Seven From America, with the plot revolving around seven Americans who helped Spyridon Louis win the marathon. Spyros Skouras of Fox announced the film would be one of three made in Greece by the studio, the others being The King Must Die and Thermopylae (which became The 300 Spartans).

The movie was done under the API banner via producer Robert L. Lippert; API produced low budget films for Fox, although the budget of It Happened In Athens was high by API standards. At one stage Dean Stockwell was announced in the cast. Juliet Prowse was considered for the female lead but Fox decided to go with Jayne Mansfield instead.

At one stage it was called Winged Victory in Athens.

Shooting
Filmed in the fall of 1960, in Greece, the film was Jayne Mansfield's last film with Fox before her career setback to low-budget British and European melodramas and comedies. Although Mansfield appears in only a supporting role, she received top billing.

Newcomer Trax Colton starred in the film. He had been discovered in a drug store and only made one film beforehand – a brief appearance in Marriage-Go-Round.

As a publicity promotion for Colton, Fox cast the unknown actor in the lead and billed him directly below sex goddess Mansfield. During the filming of the feature, Mansfield and Colton had a brief love affair, unknown at the time.

Both Nico Minardos and Bob Mathias were added as supporting characters at the last minute when the appearances of both Lt. Alexi and Coach Graham were lengthened to become more than bit players. Less experienced actors had initially been cast, but when Fox demanded the roles be lengthened, the more experienced Minardos and Mathias were brought in as replacements. Unknowns were cast in smaller and less meaningful parts that rounded out the cast.

Though thought of as one of Mansfield's latter low-budget films, It Happened in Athens was actually made on a large budget and was produced in CinemaScope and DeLuxe color. Like several other Fox films during the early 1960s, the feature was made to bring quick profit to the studio, which was going broke due to the rising costs and expanding production schedule of the expensive historical epic Cleopatra.

The end of the final race in the stadium was shot on 23 October 1960 with over 50,000 extras.

Release
Upon release, It Happened in Athens was greeted with negative reviews and was a box office disappointment, making roughly $1 million in ticket sales on a budget of nearly $1.3 million. Not long after the film's failure, Fox released both Colton and Mansfield from their studio contracts.

Both performers were released due to their box office popularity. Though Mansfield was a huge box office star in the late-1950s, her movie career had faded by this point. Colton, an unknown, was released from the studio without having had a fair chance at superstardom. According to Fox, Mansfield had not worked with them full-time due to her repeated pregnancies and they did not have enough time to promote the severely unknown Colton, who lacked faith in his own, somewhat unwanted, career in the movies.

See also
 List of American films of 1962

References

External links
 
 
 Review of film at New York Times
 
 

1962 films
American track and field films
American sports comedy-drama films
1960s English-language films
Films directed by Andrew Marton
Films about the Summer Olympics
Films set in 1896
Films set in Athens
Films set in Greece
20th Century Fox films
CinemaScope films
Films scored by Manos Hatzidakis
1960s sports comedy-drama films
1960s American films